Heatons North is an electoral ward in the Metropolitan Borough of Stockport, Greater Manchester, England. It elects three Councillors to Stockport Metropolitan Borough Council using the first past the post electoral method, electing one Councillor every year without election on the fourth.

Together with Brinnington & Central, Davenport and Cale Green, Edgeley and Cheadle Heath, Heatons South and Manor, the ward lies in the Stockport Parliamentary Constituency. The ward contains Heaton Chapel Station as well as Priestnall School. Stockport Council closed the leisure centre at Peel Moat in 2012, which stood in Heatons North.

Councillors
Heatons North electoral ward is represented in Westminster by Navendu Mishra MP for Stockport.

The ward is represented on Stockport Council by three councillors:

 John Taylor (Lab)
 Dena Ryness (Lab)
 David Sedgwick (Lab)

 indicates seat up for re-election.

Elections in the 2020s
An asterisk (*) indicates incumbent councillor seeking re-election.

May 2022

May 2021

Elections in the 2010s

May 2019

May 2018

May 2016

May 2015

May 2014

May 2012

May 2011

References

External links
Stockport Metropolitan Borough Council

Wards of the Metropolitan Borough of Stockport